The following radio stations broadcast on AM frequency 1050 kHz: 1050 AM is a Mexican clear-channel frequency.  XEG in Monterrey (Guadalupe, Nuevo León) is the dominant Class A station on this frequency. See also List of broadcast station classes.

In Argentina 
 General Güemes in Buenos Aires
 LV27 Rural in San Francisco

In Canada

In Mexico 
Stations in bold are clear-channel stations.
 XED-AM in Mexicali, Baja California - 10,000 watts days, 200 watts nights
 XEG-AM in Monterrey, Nuevo León - 100,000 watts (daytime directional antenna, nighttime omnidirectional antenna).  Transmitter located at  
 XEIP-AM in Urapan, Michoacán - 1,000 watts

In the United States

In Uruguay 
 CX 26 Radio Uruguay in Montevideo

References

Lists of radio stations by frequency